Chris Garneau (born November 5, 1982) is an American singer-songwriter and musician. Since releasing his debut album, Music for Tourists, Garneau has toured throughout the United States, Canada, Brazil, Europe, and Asia.

Garneau cites Jeff Buckley, Nina Simone, Nico, and Chan Marshall as influences. He currently resides in Los Angeles, California. His second full-length album, titled El Radio was released July 7, 2009, and his third full-length album, Winter Games, was released in 2013. His fourth studio album, Yours, was released in December 2018.

Early life

Garneau, a native of Boston, lived with his family in Paris during grade school, and later New Jersey before moving to New York City. Garneau discovered a love of music at a young age while learning to play piano. After high school, Garneau briefly attended Berklee College of Music in Boston, but left after completing one term and moved to Brooklyn. There he began writing music and playing live shows at small venues in the East Village and Lower East Side of Manhattan, including CBGB's Gallery and the Living Room.

Career
Garneau eventually signed with Absolutely Kosher Records, an Emeryville, California-based record label. He was brought to the label by Jamie Stewart and Caralee McElroy of Xiu Xiu. Garneau released his debut album Music for Tourists in October 2006 and on iTunes in January 2007. In March 2007 he did a Take-Away Show video session shot by Vincent Moon. His next project, an EP called "C-Sides", was released in December 2007.

The soundtrack to season four of TV's Grey's Anatomy includes Garneau's music.  The episode "Love/Addiction" features his song "Castle-Time," and the episode "Forever Young" features the song "Black and Blue." The series premiere of Private Practice, "In Which We Meet Addison, a Nice Girl From Somewhere Else," features the song "Sad News."

His cover of Elliott Smith's "Between the Bars" was featured in Pedro Almodóvar's 2011 film The Skin I Live In.

He has been collaborating on a yet-to-be-named musical project with Caralee McElroy.

In 2013, his third album, Winter Games, is released. Garneau asked friends to write down their first memories of winter. These memories and his move to rural countryside in the winter subsequently informed his writing for the album. In support of this record, Garneau toured Europe and China a few times, as well as a few North American shows.

In 2014, the soundtrack to the movie The Smell of Us included Garneau's music.

In June 2017, he premiered five new songs on stage as a quartet in New York City.

In November 2018, his fourth studio album Yours is released.

In January 2021, his fifth studio The Kind is released.

Chris Garneau has also scored dance pieces for choreographers such as Jonah Bokaer.

Personal life
Garneau identifies as gay.

Discography
Music for Tourists (2006)
C-Sides EP (2007)
El Radio (2009)
Winter Games (2013)
Yours (2018)
The Kind (2021)
Ballard (2022)

References

External links
 

1982 births
Living people
21st-century American pianists
21st-century American male singers
21st-century American singers
American male pianists
American gay musicians
LGBT people from Massachusetts
American LGBT singers
American LGBT songwriters
20th-century LGBT people
21st-century LGBT people
American male singer-songwriters
Singer-songwriters from Massachusetts
Gay singers
Gay songwriters
American gay writers